Miguel Tudela (born 26 December 1994) is a Peruvian surfer. He competed in the 2020 Summer Olympics.

References

1994 births
Living people
Surfers at the 2020 Summer Olympics
Peruvian surfers
Olympic surfers of Peru
People from Lima Province